Cingetorix (Celtic, "marching king" or "king of warriors") was one of the four kings of Kent during Caesar's second expedition to Britain in 54 BC, alongside Segovax, Carvilius and Taximagulus. The four were allies of the British leader Cassivellaunus, and attacked the Roman naval camp in an attempt to relieve him when he was besieged by Caesar in his stronghold north of the Thames. However the attack failed and Cassivellaunus was forced to seek terms.

References
Julius Caesar, De Bello Gallico 5:22

External links
Cantiaci at Roman-Britain.co.uk
Cantium at Romans in Britain

1st-century BC rulers in Europe
Briton kings involved in Julius Caesar's invasions of Britain
Briton rulers
Celtic warriors